Robert Taylor is a professional rugby coach Rugby union from New Zealand. Hes currently head coach of NEC Green Rockets in Japanese league one competition. Before Japan he was head coach of the Sydney University Football Club and was the Head Coach of the 2019 NSW Country Eagles team that plays in the NRC competition. Taylor joined Leicester Tigers for the 2020/21 season as an Assistant Coach.
Robert's playing career was highlighted with glory as first five for the legendary Wasps Buccaneers of 2005. Taylor was a key player in the 1993 Tawa Trust Cup winning team alongside players such as Matt Tilley and Leon McGavin.

References

Living people
Australian rugby union coaches
1980 births
Leicester Tigers coaches